The Snijders&Rockox House is a museum in Antwerp, Belgium. It is located in two neighbouring townhouses formerly owned by the artist Frans Snyders (1579–1657) and the mayor Nicolaas Rockox (1560–1640). It is owned by KBC Bank and showcases a collection of 16th century art.

History 
The house was rebuilt for Nicolaas II Rockox, lord Mayor of Antwerp. He had different houses united in 1603, and restored in Renaissance style. It was his principal residence which he used for business and it was built in baroque style. A few of Rubens' most famous artworks were specially designed for this residence, among them Samson and Delilah.

The Rockox family sold the estate in 1715 to benefit the poor: the house became property of the KBC Bank, in 1970 and it is used as a public museum.

Architecture 
The house is a typical example of the architecture that was popular with the bourgeoisie of the early 17th century in Antwerp. It has an inner garden with fine herbs, and has features of an Italian pallazo.

Collection 
The current rooms are ornated with the Old Master collection of KBC Bank. This collection is put permanently on display, like the paintings would be presented in the 17th century. However, this collection is not the historic collection as owned by the Rockox family. Besides paintings the current KBC collection includes important engravings, sculptures and textiles.

Artists whose works are on display include Jan Fyt, Cornelis Massijs, Peter Paul Rubens, Jan Sanders van Hemessen, Hans III Jordaens, Jacob Jordaens, Maerten de Vos, David Teniers, Quentin Matsys, Joachim Patinir, Frans Snyders, Lucas Faydherbe, Paulus Pontius and Lambert Lombard.

See also 
 Rubens House

References

External links
 

Museums in Antwerp
Historic house museums in Belgium